Big Timothy Mountain, formerly called Boss Mountain and Takomkane Mountain,  is a cinder cone in central British Columbia, Canada, located  west of Hendrix Lake and  southwest of Mount Perseus.

See also
List of volcanoes in Canada
Volcanism of Canada
Volcanism of Western Canada

References

Volcanoes of British Columbia
Two-thousanders of British Columbia
Cinder cones of Canada
Cariboo Land District